Daud is the Arabic name of David and is a prophet in Islam. It can also be spelled Dawood or Dawud.

Daud may also refer to:

 Daud (name), a male Arabic given name and surname (including a list of people with the name)
 Daud (film), a Hindi film
 Daud, Nepal
 Daud, a character from the Dishonored franchise

See also
 Daoud (disambiguation)
 Dawood (disambiguation)
 Dawoud
 Dawud (disambiguation)
 David (name)